Irmgard Fuest (born September 6, 1903 in Münstermaifeld, died June 22, 1980 in Neunkirchen, birth name  Irmgard Scherer) was a Saarland politician of the CVP / CDU and lawyer. She completed her legal traineeship at the Court of Appeals and passed her second state examination in 1931, then she worked as a judge at Brühl District Court and as a lawyer in Cologne. In 1935, she founded a law firm in Neunkirchen together with her husband Josef Fuest. She was the first woman to become a Judicial Councilor in the Federal Republic.

In 1975, Fuest was awarded the Saarland Order of Merit.

References

1903 births
1980 deaths
People from Mayen-Koblenz
Politicians from Saarland
20th-century German lawyers
German women lawyers
20th-century German judges
German women judges
Law firm founders
20th-century women lawyers
20th-century women judges
Recipients of the Saarland Order of Merit
20th-century German women